Sir John Barker-Mill, 1st Baronet (4 December 1803 – 20 February 1860) was an English first-class cricketer.

Born John Barker in 1803, in accordance to the last will and testament of his maternal uncle Sir Charles Mill, 10th Baronet, he took the additional name of Mill by Royal Licence on 8 May 1835.

The Reverend John Barker-Mill was created a Baronet 'of Mottisfont in the County of Southampton' on 16 March 1836.

In 1842 three local gentlemen, Thomas Chamberlayne, Sir Frederick Hervey-Bathurst and Barker-Mill himself, financed the development of the Antelope Ground in Southampton.

Barker-Mill made a single first-class appearance for Hampshire against the Marylebone Cricket Club in 1842. In his only first-class match Mill was absent hurt in both of Hampshire's innings.

In 1845, Barker-Mill as the owner of the winner of the Plymouth, Devon and Cornwall races was presented with a silver vase made by silversmith John Samuel Hunt (1785-1865) as commissioned by Queen Victoria. The vase, known as "Her Majesty's Vase", was rediscovered by the family in 2022.

Barker-Mill died at Mottisfont Abbey, Hampshire on 20 February 1860.

Marriage
Rev. John Barker married Jane (c. 1798–1884) daughter of Col. William Swinburne on 
14 August 1828 at Keynsham, Somerset. They had no issue.

Lady Jane Barker-Mill died aged 85 at Mottisfont Abbey, Hampshire on 2 January 1884.

References

External links
John Barker-Mill at Cricinfo
John Barker-Mill at CricketArchive

1803 births
1860 deaths
People from Wareham, Dorset
Cricketers from Dorset
English cricketers
Hampshire cricketers
Baronets in the Baronetage of the United Kingdom